John Brooks (born August 7, 1959, in Tucson, Arizona) is an American racing driver who competed in the American Racing Series, the Atlantic Championship,  and attempted to qualify for one CART race in 1993.

Motorsports Career Results

American Open-Wheel

American Racing Series
(key)

Atlantic Championship
(key)

CART
(key)

References

External links
 

Living people
1959 births
Sportspeople from Tucson, Arizona
Racing drivers from Arizona
Racing drivers from Tucson, Arizona
SCCA Formula Super Vee drivers
Indy Lights drivers
Atlantic Championship drivers